Adron Doran University Center, commonly known and referred to as ADUC, is the primary student activity center of Morehead State University, located in Morehead, Kentucky.

History
Adron Doran, who had served as president from 1954 to 1977, played a pivotal role in the expansion of Morehead State from a rural teacher training school into a large-scale state university. In addition to expanding the academic curriculum and introducing racial integration to the campus, Doran also felt the need to make the campus of Morehead State feel more like a home to students. Along with adding more dormitories and on-campus living areas, Doran also sought to create a designated building to serve students in a variety of ways, as a place to study, socialize, and serve basic needs for students. In addition, Doran would make sure that the building bore his namesake.

Adron Doran
Was born September 1, 1909, in Graves County, Western Kentucky. Some would say that he was one of the most influential and progressive of all the former presidents, because of the vast changes he brought about in a time where the school was still in a very infantile state. Graduated From Freed-Hardman College in Henderson, Tennessee. Former Kentucky House speaker and state representative. Earned a doctorate from the University of Kentucky in 1950.

Was named President of Morehead State University in 1954 and then retired in 1977. Died November 23, 2001.

ADUC today

The building offers chances for socialization, dining services, the office of the Dean of Students, meeting spaces, the Vice President of Student Life, the University Bookstore, campus post office, Student Government Association, and many other student-related offices. Through recent years of expansion, the center has made way for an on-campus bookstore, where students can shop for textbooks and MSU athletic apparel.

References

External links
 Official Morehead State website
 Official ADUC website
 Information page on ADUC's renovation

Morehead State University